Min önskejul was released in 1997 and is a Christmas album from Swedish singer Sanna Nielsen. "Där Bor En Sång" was released as a single.

The album was re-released on November 19, 2001, with three new tracks: "O Helga Natt", "Ave Maria" and "Tusen Ljus". Also, the artwork was new and the running order changed.

1997 Track listing
Min Önskejul	
Jag Har Tänt Ett Juleljus	
Tindra Stjärna I Juletid	
Gläns Över Sjö Och Strand	
Hör Hur Den Klingar	
Julpotpurri (Hej, mitt vinterland, Jag såg mamma kyssa tomten, Bjällerklang)
Där Bor En Sång	
Jul Vid Den Heliges Port	
Juletid, Juletid	
Jag Bor På En Stjärna (Pomp And Circumstance)	
Då Är Det Jul (Jag Är En Gäst Och Främling)	
Stilla Natt	
Låt Mej Få Tända Ett Ljus

2001 Track listing
O helga natt
Jag bor på en stjärna (Pomp and Circumstance)
Min önskejul
Jul vid den Heliges Port
Jag har tänt ett juleljus
Juletid, juletid
Julpotpurri (Hej, mitt vinterland, Jag såg mamma kyssa tomten, Bjällerklang)
Gläns över sjö och strand
Tindra stjärna i juletid
Då är det jul
Ave Maria
Hör hur den klingar
Tusen ljus
Stilla natt
Där bor en sång
Låt mig få tända ett ljus

References

1997 Christmas albums
Christmas albums by Swedish artists
Sanna Nielsen albums
Swedish-language albums